The Regionalliga West was the second-highest level of the German football league system in the west of Germany from 1963 until the formation of the 2. Bundesliga in 1974. It covered the state of Nordrhein-Westfalen, the most populous state of Germany.

Overview
The league started out in 1963 with 20 teams in the league, which was reduced to 18 the year after.

It was formed from the eleven clubs of the Oberliga West which were not admitted to the new Bundesliga, from the top eight clubs of the 2. Oberliga West and one club from the Verbandsliga Westfalen, the Lüner SV. The Regionalliga West was as such a continuation of the Oberliga West under a different name and a tier lower.

Along with the Regionalliga West went another four Regionalligas, these five formed the second tier of German football until 1974:
 Regionalliga Nord, covering the states of Niedersachsen, Schleswig-Holstein, Bremen and Hamburg
 Regionalliga Süd, covering the state of Bayern, Hessen and Baden-Württemberg
 Regionalliga Berlin, covering West-Berlin
 Regionalliga Südwest, covering the states of Rheinland-Pfalz and Saarland

The new Regionalligas were formed along the borders of the old post-World War II Oberligas, not after a balanced regional system.  Therefore, the Oberligas Berlin and West covered small but populous areas while Nord and Süd covered large areas.  Südwest was something of an anomaly, neither large nor populous.

The winners and runners-up of this league were admitted to the promotion play-off to the Bundesliga, which was staged in two groups of originally four, later five teams each with the winner of each group going up.

The bottom teams in a varying amount were relegated to the Verbandsligas. Below the Regionalliga West were the following Verbandsligas:
 Verbandsliga Niederrhein
 Verbandsliga Mittelrhein
 Verbandsliga Westfalen 1
 Verbandsliga Westfalen 2

Schwarz-Weiß Essen is the only club to have played in all eleven seasons of the Regionalliga West.

Disbanding of the Regionalliga West
The league was dissolved in 1974. According to their performance of the last couple of seasons, 11 clubs of the Regionalliga went to the new 2. Bundesliga Nord. The seven remaining clubs were relegated to the Amateurligas.

The teams admitted to the 2. Bundesliga Nord were:
 SG Wattenscheid 09
 Rot-Weiss Oberhausen
 Bayer Uerdingen
 1. FC Mülheim
 Preußen Münster
 Borussia Dortmund
 Alemannia Aachen
 Schwarz-Weiss Essen
 DJK Gütersloh
 SpVgg Erkenschwick
 Arminia Bielefeld

The following teams were relegated to the Amateurligas:
 to Amateurliga Westfalen Nordost: Arminia Gütersloh, Eintracht Gelsenkirchen
 to Amateurliga Westfalen Südwest: Rot-Weiß Lüdenscheid, Sportfreunde Siegen, Westfalia Herne
 to Amateurliga Mittelrhein: Viktoria Köln
 to Amateurliga Niederrhein: Union Solingen

Re-formation of the Regionalliga West

In 1994, the Regionalligas were re-established, after 20 years, this time as the third tier of German Football. The new Regionalliga West/Südwest was a merger of the two old Regionalligas Südwest and West. In 2000, this league was disbanded again and its clubs spread over the Regionalligas Süd and Nord.

In 2008, the Regionalliga West reformed again, covering the same territory as the Regionalliga West/Südwest did but now called West only. It is the fourth tier of football in Germany.

Champions and runners-up of the Regionalliga West
The winners and runners-up of the league were:

 Bold denotes team went on to gain promotion to the Bundesliga.
 Alemannia Aachen (1964, 1967, 1999), SG Wattenscheid 09 (1974, 1997), Rot–Weiss Oberhausen (1969, 1998) and Rot–Weiss Essen (1973, 2004, 2006) all have won the old and the new Regionalliga.

Placings in the Regionalliga West 1963 to 1974 
The league placings from 1963 to 1974:

Source:

Key

Notes
 Duisburger SV and Duisburg 48/99 merged in 1964 to form Eintracht Duisburg.
 In 1973, Eintracht Gelsenkirchen merged with STV Horst-Emscher, calling itself STV Eintracht Gelsenkirchen until 1978, then STV Horst-Emscher again.

References

Sources
 Deutschlands Fußball in Zahlen,  An annual publication with tables and results from the Bundesliga to Verbandsliga/Landesliga, publisher: DSFS
 Kicker Almanach,  The yearbook on German football from Bundesliga to Oberliga, since 1937, published by the Kicker Sports Magazine
 Die Deutsche Liga-Chronik 1945–2005  History of German football from 1945 to 2005 in tables, publisher: DSFS, published: 2006

External links 
  Das deutsche Fussball Archiv 
 Regionalligas at Fussballdaten.de 

Defunct association football leagues in Germany
West
Football competitions in North Rhine-Westphalia
1963 establishments in West Germany
1974 disestablishments in West Germany
Sports leagues established in 1963
Ger
Sports leagues disestablished in 1974